A by-election for the seat of Canterbury in the New South Wales Legislative Assembly was held on 9 June 1900 because of the resignation of Varney Parkes.

Dates

Results

Varney Parkes resigned.

Aftermath
While Sydney Smith was declared elected, the by-election was declared void by the Elections and Qualifications Committee  because of irregularities in the way the returning officer dealt with unused ballot papers and that people had voted who did not have an elector's right at the time the writ was issued. Thomas Taylor won the subsequent by-election.

See also
Electoral results for the district of Canterbury
List of New South Wales state by-elections

References

1900 elections in Australia
New South Wales state by-elections
1900s in New South Wales